Carlos Bernardo Chasseing (25 September 1926 – 16 April 2018) was de facto Federal Interventor of Córdoba, Argentina from April 12, 1976 to February 2, 1979.

References

1926 births
2018 deaths
Place of birth missing
Governors of Córdoba Province, Argentina